Daisy Pearce (born 27 May 1988) is a former Australian rules footballer who played for the Melbourne Football Club in the AFL Women's (AFLW), and is currently a development coach with the Geelong Football Club's Australian Football League (AFL) team. Often regarded as the face of women's Australian rules football, Pearce served as Melbourne captain from the competition's inaugural season in 2017 until her retirement at the end of season seven, having previously captained the club in the women's exhibition games staged prior to the 2016 creation of the league. She captained Victoria in the inaugural AFL Women's State of Origin match in 2017, where she was adjudged best afield.

Pearce began her state league career in 2005 with the Darebin Falcons in the Victorian Women's Football League (VWFL), captaining the club from 2008 to 2016 and playing roughly 200 games until her final match in 2017. She is a ten-time premiership player (seven times as captain), seven-time league best and fairest winner in the VWFL and VFL Women's (VFLW) competitions and five-time Darebin best and fairest winner. She represented Victoria at both under-19 and senior level, and was recruited by Melbourne with the first selection in the inaugural national women's draft in 2013 for the first women's exhibition game.

Pearce was a marquee signing for Melbourne's AFL Women's team leading into the competition's first season in 2017. At AFLW level, Pearce is a three-time AFL Women's All-Australian, having been named captain in the 2017 team and vice-captain in the 2018 team, and captained Melbourne to its first AFL Women's premiership in season seven. She is a three-time Melbourne best and fairest winner and a four-time AFLPA AFLW best captain. Pearce began her coaching career as a development coach with Geelong's AFL team in 2023.

Outside her playing career, Pearce became an established media personality in both television and radio. She is an expert commentator for the Seven Network and 1116 SEN's AFL coverage; she appeared on the Seven Network program AFL Game Day as a rotating panel member from 2016 until the show's cancellation in 2020 and hosted her own podcast on SEN, This Is Grit, in 2019. The VFL Women's best and fairest award, of which Pearce was the inaugural recipient in 2016, was named the Lambert–Pearce Medal partly in her honour in 2018.

Early life
Daisy Pearce was born on 27 May 1988 in Bright, Victoria, to parents Daryl and Dee. She has two brothers, Will and Harry; two younger half-siblings, Ruby and Ali, through her mother; and an older half-brother, Aaron, through her father. Her parents separated in 1995 and her mother and brothers relocated to the Melbourne suburb of Eltham while Daisy remained with her father in Wandiligong, near Bright in the Alpine Shire area, where she attended Bright P-12 College. When Pearce was a teenager, she returned to live with her mother and the rest of the family, and attended Eltham High School.

As a child, Pearce supported the Carlton Football Club, and one of her favourite players was Carlton premiership player and former captain Brett Ratten. She was enrolled in the Vickick program, which later became Auskick, and played junior football alongside boys as a child. Her father was a coach at the Bright Football Club, which allowed Pearce to begin training with the under-13 boys team from the age of eight; she played alongside her brother Harry and future  premiership defender Ben Reid. Pearce needed dispensation from the local league to continue playing alongside boys as a teenager, but was disallowed, which played a part in her decision to move to Eltham. At high school, she took up netball, tennis and volleyball, making a national youth squad for the latter, before eventually picking up football again.

Early football career

State league and representative football

In 2007, Darebin went through the VWFL season undefeated, defeating  in the grand final, and Pearce was named among the best players in the grand final. Darebin would go on to win five VWFL premierships in a row, before losing to St Albans in the grand final in 2011; Pearce, who had by then become captain, was named Darebin's best player in the loss. In 2013 and 2014, Darebin went through both seasons undefeated, defeating  by 49 points in the 2013 grand final and 30 points in the 2014 grand final; Pearce was best afield in the latter. She featured in Darebin's third consecutive grand final win over Diamond Creek in 2015. During her career in the VWFL, Pearce won the Darebin best and fairest award five times and the Helen Lambert Medal as the VWFL's best and fairest player six times.

Pearce was a member of the Australian team that played against Ireland in the 2006 Ladies' International Rules Series which, as of 2016, remains the only women's series to have taken place. In June 2007, at the age of 19, she was one of two VWFL representatives, alongside Shannon McFerran, named to play in the E. J. Whitten Legends Game; Pearce was named in the Victorian team while McFerran was named for the All Stars, marking the first time female players were included in the annual charity match. Pearce captained the Victoria under-19 team at the 2007 AFL Women's National Championships; she was named in the championships' All-Australian team and won the award for joint-player of the tournament. Pearce was named in the leadership group for the Victorian senior team at the 2009 championships and was again named in the championships' All-Australian team. She was named deputy vice-captain for Victoria at the 2011 championships.

In March 2016, the VFL Women's (VFLW) was launched and Darebin was named among ten teams from the VWFL to participate in Victoria's new state league competition. Pearce won the inaugural VFL Women's best and fairest award and played in the first VFLW premiership in 2016 as Darebin defeated Melbourne University. She played in Darebin's grand final win over Diamond Creek in 2017, kicking a goal and receiving praise from coach Jane Lange for her leadership and commitment as Darebin won its fifth consecutive state league premiership and tenth in twelve seasons.

Women's exhibition games
Fifty of the top female footballers in Australia were selected in the inaugural national women's draft later that month to play for the two clubs at the Melbourne Cricket Ground (MCG) in a curtain raiser to the AFL match between the clubs in June; Pearce was recruited by Melbourne with the first selection in the draft, and was later named as Melbourne's captain. She was adjudged best afield with 28 disposals in the first exhibition game, which Melbourne won by 32 points in front of a crowd of almost 8,000. A second exhibition game between the two clubs, again played as a curtain raiser to the men's match and this time at Etihad Stadium, was announced in June 2014; Pearce was named among Melbourne's best players in its 46-point win.

In February 2015, the AFL announced that two women's exhibition games would be played that year between Melbourne and the Western Bulldogs, the first to be played at the MCG in May and the second to be played at Etihad Stadium in August. Pearce was named among Melbourne's best players with 23 disposals in the first match, which Melbourne won by eight points, and was best afield with 30 disposals in the second match, which Melbourne won by four points. Later that year, she was named as the inaugural winner of the club's best female player award, polling five out of a possible six votes from the two matches. In February 2016, the AFL announced a ten-match national exhibition series to be played throughout the year, in which Melbourne played two games against the Western Bulldogs in March and September, as well as a match against a  women's team at the MCG in May. Pearce was best afield with 33 disposals and eleven marks in the first match, which Melbourne lost by 20 points, and was named among Melbourne's best players in its 71-point win over Brisbane. She was Melbourne's best player in its 39-point loss to the Bulldogs in September; the match was watched by an average audience of 387,000 people in Melbourne, which was greater than the average viewing audience for every Saturday night game during the 2016 AFL home-and-away season, as well as a national audience peak of over one million people.

AFL Women's career

2017–2019: Midfield seasons and pregnancy

In July 2016, Pearce and Melissa Hickey were announced as 's two marquee players for the inaugural AFL Women's season in 2017. Pearce was announced as the club's first AFLW captain in January 2017. She made her AFL Women's debut in Melbourne's inaugural match in round 1 against  at the club's home ground, Casey Fields, and was listed among her team's best players in the loss, recording 19 disposals and nine tackles. Pearce was among Melbourne's best players in every game for the season; she was named by the AFL Players Association (AFLPA) as "Player of the Week" for round 4 after recording 29 disposals and six tackles in Melbourne's win against  and was awarded the maximum three votes for the AFL Women's best and fairest award in Melbourne's round 6 match against . Following the home-and-away season, she revealed that she played the first two rounds with an injury after sustaining bone bruising and a corked calf in the opening round, and had sat out training for the entire week leading into round 2. At the end of the season, Pearce was named captain of the 2017 AFL Women's All-Australian team. She won the inaugural Melbourne best and fairest award and AFLPA AFLW best captain award, and was one of three Melbourne players nominated by her teammates for the AFLPA AFLW most valuable player award. She averaged 21.9 disposals, the most of any player in the inaugural season. Melbourne re-signed Pearce for the 2018 season during the trade and signing period in May. She then captained Victoria in the inaugural AFL Women's State of Origin match on 2 September in front of a crowd of 9,400, where she was adjudged best afield with 37 disposals in the 97-point win.

In January 2018, Pearce was re-elected as Melbourne captain. Pearce polled a game-high nine votes for the AFL Coaches Association (AFLCA) AFLW champion player of the year award in rounds 1 and 3 and the maximum ten votes in round 5, and was selected in afl.com.aus Team of the Week in the same rounds. At the end of the season, Pearce was named vice-captain of the 2018 AFL Women's All-Australian team, and again won the Melbourne best and fairest award and AFLPA AFLW best captain award. She was again nominated by her teammates for the AFLPA AFLW most valuable player award. Melbourne signed Pearce for the 2019 season during the trade and signing period in May. However, on 31 August, Pearce announced her pregnancy with twins, which would result in her missing the 2019 season; she was retained as an inactive player, and Elise O'Dea and Shelley Scott were eventually announced as co-captains in her place.

Pearce continued to mentor and work with Melbourne players in an unofficial assistant coach role when they returned for pre-season training in November 2018, and gave birth to twins in February 2019. By April, she was back to her playing weight, and later that month, she re-signed with Melbourne for the 2020 season. In July 2019, Pearce returned to the club to train three days a week as part of what she called her "pre-pre-pre-season" for 2020, adding that she was surprised by how her body had responded after her twins' birth, and resumed training with her Melbourne teammates three weeks later. In August, Pearce was announced as an assistant coach to Dermott Brereton for the Victorian team in that year's E.J. Whitten Legends Game.

2020–2021: Return to football and position shifts

Pearce was reinstated as Melbourne captain in January 2020. Coach Mick Stinear said, "With her knowledge of our game plan, and her ability to instruct, support and give feedback on and off the field, she's just the ideal person to lead this group". She ran a personal best time over two kilometres in the lead-up to the season. Later that month, Pearce made a successful return to football, playing the first three quarters of Melbourne's practice match win against Collingwood. Leading into the season, womens.afl journalist Sarah Black named Pearce at no. 5 on her list of the top 30 players in the AFLW. Pearce was named among Melbourne's best players in five of its six home-and-away matches for the season; she polled eight coaches' votes in round 2 and five in round 3, and was selected in womens.afls Team of the Week for round 2. After round 6, the last two home-and-away rounds were abandoned and a modified finals series was brought forward due to the impact of the COVID-19 pandemic, allowing Melbourne to qualify for finals for the first time. Pearce was selected in the initial 40-woman squad for the 2020 AFL Women's All-Australian team, and was voted as the AFLPA AFLW best captain and nominated by her teammates for the AFLPA AFLW most valuable player award for the third time.

Leading into the 2021 season, Pearce was named as Melbourne captain for a fourth season, and was named by Sarah Black at no. 9 on her annual list of the top 30 players in the AFLW. Prior to the opening game of the season, Pearce said that she had been "squeezed out of the midfield, officially" and would continue to primarily play at half-back while still making small appearances in the midfield. Pearce polled the maximum three AFL Women's best and fairest votes in Melbourne's round 1 win against . Pearce was named among Melbourne's best players in round 8 after kicking a goal and setting up the match-winning goal in the club's close win over Fremantle, which assured its position in that year's finals series. She injured the medial collateral ligament (MCL) in her right knee in the opening two minutes of Melbourne's close win over Brisbane the following week after her leg was caught underneath her in a tackle, which ruled her out of Melbourne's qualifying final win against Fremantle and preliminary final loss to Adelaide. Following the preliminary final, Pearce placed second in that year's AFLPA AFLW best captain award behind  captain Ellie Blackburn; she revealed the next day that she had suffered a small tear to the anterior cruciate ligament (ACL) in her right knee in the round 9 game, and that she would have surgery to repair the MCL while allowing the ACL to heal naturally.

2022: 13-goal season, premiership and retirement

Pearce was named as Melbourne captain for a fifth season leading into 2022, continuing in her forward role from midway through the previous season. Stinear said that she was the strongest he had ever seen her; Pearce said that she had focused more heavily on weights and more of a strength and power focus over running during the pre-season. She polled the maximum three AFL Women's best and fairest votes in Melbourne's round 1 win over the Western Bulldogs and was among Melbourne's best players in its loss to Adelaide in round 4, kicking two of the team's three goals for the game. At the halfway point of the season, Pearce was equal-third in the competition for average score involvements with 4.4 per game. She was among Melbourne's best players in its win over Brisbane in round 7, shifting back into defence during the match to record 15 disposals; she received five coaches' votes and was selected in womens.afls Team of the Week for round 7. Pearce was among Melbourne's best players with five goals in its record-breaking win over Fremantle in round 9, becoming Melbourne's first AFLW player and the fourth AFLW player overall to kick five goals in a match; she received the maximum ten coaches' votes, was selected in womens.afls Team of the Week for round 9 and polled the maximum three AFL Women's best and fairest votes. She was among Melbourne's best players in its win over Carlton in round 10, kicking two goals and alternating between attack and defence to help Melbourne secure a top-two finish at the end of the home-and-away season. Pearce played in Melbourne's preliminary final win over Brisbane in the first AFLW match played at the MCG to help the club progress to the 2022 AFL Women's Grand Final, its first grand final appearance. She was named in Champion Data's 2022 AFLW All-Star stats team after leading the competition for score involvements with 1.5 per game and kicking 13 goals in ten games, was named in the 2022 AFL Women's All-Australian team, her third All-Australian selection, and was voted as the AFLPA AFLW best captain for the fourth time in her career. Pearce played in Melbourne's loss to Adelaide in the grand final, playing a key role in defence and on the wing. Following the grand final, she won her third Melbourne best and fairest award by a single vote. In May, Pearce said that she would continue playing for "at least one more" season, with the competition's seventh season taking place later in the year.

In August, Pearce was named at no. 25 in Sarah Black's season seven list of the top 30 players in the AFLW and was named as Melbourne captain for a sixth season. She kicked a goal from eight disposals in Melbourne's round 1 win over Adelaide, playing a negating role on Adelaide defender Sarah Allan as part of her role to "keep [Adelaide's] intercept (possession) game to a minimum". Pearce was among Melbourne's best players in its win over North Melbourne in round 2 with two goals. In the lead-up to her 50th AFLW game, Pearce said that while she would "love" an AFLW premiership, "It's less about ticking that box and having a premiership than it is about love for the game [...] I think I'll walk away still really fulfilled and feeling like the game has given me so much". She played her 50th game in Melbourne's win over Gold Coast in round 8, kicking a goal from 11 disposals and six marks. Pearce kicked the winning goal in Melbourne's preliminary final win over North Melbourne to help the club progress to the AFL Women's season seven Grand Final, its second consecutive grand final appearance. She played in Melbourne's premiership win over Brisbane the following week, one of five inaugural Melbourne players (the others being Sarah Lampard, Lily Mithen, Karen Paxman and Lauren Pearce; Stinear was also their inaugural coach) to do so. In January 2023, Pearce announced her playing retirement.

Playing style and positions

Pearce is known for being a smart, skilled and composed player who directs play on-field. Longtime Melbourne coach Mick Stinear described Pearce as an "on-field coach" while former teammate Shelley Heath described her as "essentially another coach on the ground".

Pearce began her AFL Women's career playing primarily as a midfielder, having achieved most of her recognition playing in that position; her average of 21.9 disposals per game in 2017 was the highest of any player. Upon her return to football in 2020 after the birth of her twins, Pearce began playing as a defender before playing primarily as a forward from midway through the 2021 season; the five goals that she kicked in round 9 of the 2022 season were the most in a game by a Melbourne AFLW player.

Statistics

|-
| 2017 ||  || 6
| 7 || 1 || 1 || 79 || bgcolor=CAE1FF | 74† || 153 || 16 || 36 || 0.1 || 0.1 || 11.3 || bgcolor=CAE1FF | 10.6† || bgcolor=CAE1FF | 21.9† || 2.3 || 5.1 || 7
|-
| 2018 ||  || 6
| 7 || 2 || 1 || 89 || 38 || 127 || 11 || 37 || 0.3 || 0.1 || 12.7 || 5.4 || 18.1 || 1.6 || 5.3 || 6
|-
| 2019 ||  || 6
| 0 || — || — || — || — || — || — || — || — || — || — || — || — || — || — || 0
|-
| 2020 ||  || 6
| 7 || 0 || 0 || 68 || 36 || 104 || 19 || 20 || 0.0 || 0.0 || 9.7 || 5.1 || 14.9 || 2.7 || 2.9 || 2
|-
| 2021 ||  || 6
| 9 || 3 || 4 || 67 || 22 || 89 || 17 || 25 || 0.3 || 0.4 || 7.4 || 2.4 || 9.9 || 1.9 || 2.8 || 3
|-
| 2022 ||  || 6
| 12 || 13 || 7 || 93 || 37 || 130 || 27 || 21 || 1.1 || 0.6 || 7.8 || 3.1 || 10.8 || 2.3 || 1.8 || 6
|-
| bgcolor=F0E68C |  ||  || 6
| 13 || 6 || 9 || 75 || 47 || 122 || 25 || 21 || 0.5 || 0.7 || 5.8 || 3.6 || 9.4 || 1.9 || 1.6 || 1
|- class=sortbottom
! colspan=3 | Career
! 55 !! 25 !! 22 !! 471 !! 254 !! 725 !! 115 !! 160 !! 0.5 !! 0.4 !! 8.6 !! 4.6 !! 13.2 !! 2.1 !! 2.9 !! 25
|}

Honours and achievements

Team
 AFL Women's premiership player: S7 (c)

Individual
 Melbourne captain: 2017–2018, 2020–S7
 3× AFL Women's All-Australian team: 2017 (c), 2018, 2022
 3× Melbourne best and fairest: 2017, 2018, 2022
 4× AFLPA AFLW best captain: 2017, 2018, 2020, 2022
 AFL Women's State of Origin best-on-ground: 2017
 Victoria representative honours in AFL Women's State of Origin: 2017

Coaching career
In October 2021, Pearce was among eight women, including five current and former AFLW players, selected in the AFL's women's coaching academy for 2022; she completed a national AFL level three coaching accreditation course as part of the academy, designed to "accelerate the next generation of female coaches" in Australian rules football, and was mentored by former Darebin and St Kilda coach Peta Searle as part of the twelve-month program.

By March 2022, Pearce was considering an assistant coaching role for 's AFL team; she had earlier been offered the position of 's inaugural AFLW coach and turned it down after serious consideration. Later that month, she joined the AFL Academy as a coach of its women's program, and in June, Pearce accepted a coaching position at Geelong as part of the AFL's women's coaching acceleration program. She was one of four current AFLW players and nine women overall to receive a position at a club; the program enabled the successful women to start their role anytime before 2025, which allowed Pearce to continue playing until she decided to begin in the role.

2023–present: Geelong AFL development coach
Pearce began her role as a development coach with Geelong in February 2023, having signed a four-year contract.

Media career

Pearce is an expert commentator for the Seven Network's AFL coverage on television and AFL Nation's AFL coverage for 1116 SEN on radio. In 2016, Pearce began appearing as a panel member on the Seven Network program AFL Game Day; she was set to continue in the role in 2020 before the show was cancelled due to the COVID-19 pandemic. In 2018, Pearce began appearing on the SEN morning shows SEN Breakfast (with Garry Lyon and Tim Watson) and Whateley (with Gerard Whateley), and in 2019, she hosted This Is Grit, a weekly podcast series on SEN focusing on sportswomen. In 2021, she co-hosted The W Show for AFL Media alongside Nat Edwards, where they analysed and discussed AFL Women's news and topics. She previously provided special comments for radio network Triple M in 2017 and has written columns for newspaper The Age.

Pearce was a boundary rider for Seven's coverage of the AFL Grand Final in 2018 and 2019. In 2021, she became the first woman to provide special comments for Seven's coverage of the grand final, and was widely praised by fans and media for her commentary. Pearce won the award for Best Opinion/Analysis – TV/Radio at the 2021 Australian Football Media Association Awards, with the AFMA commenting: "Daisy's football knowledge is incredible and she leaves viewers with a better appreciation of the game". Pearce was shifted to Seven's Friday night commentary team for the 2022 season, before moving to Thursday nights in 2023 upon commencing her coaching role with Geelong's AFL team.

Advocacy

Pearce has advocated for both men and women to commentate and talk about women's football in the media. After Tiffany Cherry spoke out against the Nine Network in February 2018 for failing to stand up for gender equality after being replaced by Clint Stanaway as host of the Nine program Women's Footy, Pearce said, "I enjoy seeing men working across and well-informed football commentators talking about [women's football]... why can't we see men working across the AFL Women's competition?" She said that if there was a belief that only women should call AFLW games and only men should call AFL games, "It's almost as if we are taking a few steps back". Pearce believed that this applied to coaching, saying that while she supported women coaching in football, she wanted "the best coach that's out there" to coach her, describing Stinear as "the best coach for the job" at Melbourne.

One of several high-profile players to speak out during the AFLW's 2020–2022 collective bargaining agreement negotiations in 2019, Pearce supported the AFL Players Association and the AFL's deal to gradually extend the length of AFLW seasons over the three-year period and played down talks of a crisis developing after a group of players considered splitting from the AFLPA to create their own players union. She believed that broader talks between the AFLPA and AFLW players, which would allow more players to speak directly to the AFLPA, would result in an agreement that would satisfy all players. "[If] the AFL Players Association tell us that moving forward 'we're going to improve communications [...] because we've acknowledged there's some challenges with communicating with part-time girls', I trust that they'll do that".

Legacy

Pearce is often regarded by media as the face of women's Australian rules football and is highly regarded across the football industry for her professionalism, football knowledge and leadership, both on and off the field, as well as being a role model for current and future female footballers. Herald Sun journalist Jay Clark wrote that Pearce had "set the standard in training and professionalism [in women's football] for years" and that her contributions "over more than a decade [made] her a living legend of the women's game", while SEN broadcaster Gerard Whateley called Pearce "the defining figure of the AFLW era" and "the face of a social movement as well as a sport".

In 2016, Pearce was named Football Woman of the Year for her work as the AFL's female football ambassador, an AFL talent coordinator and a graduate intern at the Melbourne Football Club. In February 2017, Melbourne unveiled its new AFLW mascot, a costumed human depicting a "young female footy player", named Daisy in honour of Pearce. On 7 March 2017, Pearce became the first woman to be elected as a director on the board of the AFLPA; the association had decided that day to include AFLW players as full members.

In September 2018, the VFL Women's best and fairest award was named the Lambert–Pearce Medal to honour Pearce and VWFL founding committee member and former president Helen Lambert. Pearce won the inaugural award in 2016 after winning six Helen Lambert Medals in the VWFL.

Personal life

Pearce studied a Bachelor of Nursing and Midwifery at La Trobe University, graduating in 2010 and receiving a Distinguished Alumni award in 2019. She worked as a midwife at Box Hill Hospital and lived in Eltham at the time. Pearce gave birth to twins with her partner, firefighter Ben O'Neill, in February 2019 via a caesarean section. Her son was diagnosed with dextrocardia while she was pregnant. In October 2020, Pearce and her family relocated to Porepunkah, near Bright, and she has since divided her time between there and Melbourne.

In June 2021, Pearce participated in the annual Big Freeze at the 'G event to raise funds for motor neurone disease (MND) research, sliding into the ice bath at the MCG in costume as the titular character from the Australian animated series Bluey. The 2021 edition of the event raised more than $10 million for Neale Daniher's charity, Fight MND. Following her 50th AFLW game in 2022, which coincided with season seven's Pride Round, Pearce decided to sell her specially-designed guernsey at auction and donate all funds to The Reach Foundation, a youth not-for-profit organisation established by former Melbourne player and president Jim Stynes.

Notes

References

External links

 

Living people
1988 births
People from Bright, Victoria
Melbourne Football Club (AFLW) players
All-Australians (AFL Women's)
Australia women's international rules football team players
Darebin Falcons players
Australian rules football commentators
Women sports announcers
Australian rules footballers from Melbourne
People from Eltham, Victoria